Bank Hey (also Sunnybower or Sunny Bower) is a suburb of Blackburn, Lancashire, England. It is located to the east of the town, north of Whitebirk and near the boundary with Hyndburn.

Geography of Blackburn with Darwen